Hans Kasper (17 January 1939 – 20 January 2023) was a German politician. A member of the Social Democratic Party, he served in the Landtag of Saarland from 1970 to 1999.

Kasper died on 20 January 2023, at the age of 84.

References

1939 births
2023 deaths
Social Democratic Party of Germany politicians
Members of the Landtag of Saarland
People from Wismar